The 2022–23 Federation Cup (due to sponsorship from Bashundhara Group also known as Bashundhara Group Federation Cup 2022–23) is the 34th edition of the tournament, the main domestic annual top-tier clubs football competition in Bangladesh organized by Bangladesh Football Federation (BFF). The eleven  participants are competing in the tournament. The tournament being played from 20 December 2022–18 July 2023.The winner of the tournament will earn the slot of playing Qualifying play-off of 2024–25 AFC Cup.

Dhaka Abahani are current champions. The club have defeated Rahmatganj MFS by 2–1 on 9 January  2022 to lift the trophy for the twelfth time.

Participating teams 
The following eleven teams will contest in the tournament.

Venues 
The matches will played at these three venues across these country.

Draw 
The draw ceremony were held on 16:00 25 November 2022 at 3rd floor of BFF house Motijheel, Dhaka. There are eleven team was divided into three groups. The top two teams from each group and two best third-placed teams will qualify for the Knock out stages.

Group summary

Round Matches Dates

Match officials
Referees

 Sabuj Das
 Md Anisur Rahman Sagor
 Md Nasir Uddin
 Bhubon Mohon Tarafder
 Md Jalal Uddin
 Md Alamgir Sarkar
 Rimon Mahmud

Assistant Referees
 Md Rasel Mahmud
 Bayezid Mondol
 Mehedi Hasan Emon
 Sheikh Iqbal Alam
 Md Shah Alam
 Sujoy Barua
 Soumik Pal
 Md Rimon Mahmud
 Md Nuruzzaman
 Anwar Hossain Saju
 Sabbir Salek Shuvo
 Md Monir Dhali

Group stages

Tiebreakers
Teams were ranked according to points (3 points for a win, 1 point for a draw, 0 points for a loss), and if tied on points, the following tie-breaking criteria were applied, in the order given, to determine the rankings.
Points in head-to-head matches among tied teams;
Goal difference in head-to-head matches among tied teams;
Goals scored in head-to-head matches among tied teams;
If more than two teams are tied, and after applying all head-to-head criteria above, a subset of teams are still tied, all head-to-head criteria above are reapplied exclusively to this subset of teams;
Goal difference in all group matches;
Goals scored in all group matches;
Penalty shoot-out if only two teams were tied and they met in the last round of the group;
Disciplinary points (yellow card = 1 point, red card as a result of two yellow cards = 3 points, direct red card = 3 points, yellow card followed by direct red card = 4 points);
Drawing of lots.

Group A

Group B

Group C

Ranking of third-placed teams
Due to groups having different numbers of teams, the results against the fourth-placed teams in four-team groups are not considered for this ranking.

Knockout stage
In the knockout stages, if a match finished goalless at the end of normal playing time, extra time would have been played (two periods of 15 minutes each) and followed, if necessary, by a penalty shoot-out to determine the winner.

Bracket

Quarter-finals

Semi-finals

Third-place

Final

Statistics

Goalscorers

Own goals 
† Bold Club indicates winner of the match

See also 
2022–23 Independence Cup (Bangladesh)
2022–23 Bangladesh Premier League (football)

References 

Bangladesh Federation Cup
1
2021–22 Asian domestic association football cups